Trombidium dacicum is a species of mite in the genus Trombidium in the family Trombidiidae. It is found in Poland and Romania.

Name
The species name is derived from Dacia, the ancient name for a region including modern Romania.

References
 Synopsis of the described Arachnida of the World: Trombidiidae

Trombidiidae
Animals described in 1950
Arachnids of Europe